William Henry Allison (June 14, 1838 – December 15, 1934) was a Canadian politician and school lands commissioner. He was elected as a Conservative to the House of Commons of Canada in the 1878 election in the riding of Hants and re-elected in 1882.

Allison was the son of James Whidden Allison, who had served as a member of the provincial assembly, and Margaret Elder. Allison was educated in Sackville, New Brunswick and later was a captain in the local militia. Between 1871 and 1878, he was a member of the Legislative Assembly of Nova Scotia for Hants County. Allison ran unsuccessfully for a seat in the House of Commons in 1874.

His brother David served as president of Mount Allison University. He died in Chamberlain, South Dakota in 1934, aged 96.

Electoral record

References 

 
 

1838 births
1934 deaths
Conservative Party of Canada (1867–1942) MPs
Members of the House of Commons of Canada from Nova Scotia
Progressive Conservative Association of Nova Scotia MLAs
People from Hants County, Nova Scotia